The badminton competition at the 1974 British Commonwealth Games took place in Christchurch, New Zealand from 24 January until 31 January 1974. Paul Whetnall withdrew from the men's singles bronze medal play off and the mixed doubles final due to injury.

Final results

Results

Men's singles

Women's singles

Men's doubles

Women's doubles

Mixed doubles

References

1974
1974 British Commonwealth Games events
1974 in badminton
Badminton tournaments in New Zealand